Mahembe is an administrative ward in Kigoma District of Kigoma Region in Tanzania. 
In 2016 the Tanzania National Bureau of Statistics report there were 14,435 people in the ward, from 22,763 in 2012. Prior to 2014 Nkungwe was a village in the Mahembe Ward before splitting off into is own ward.

Villages / neighborhoods 
The ward has 2 villages and 11 hamlets.

 Mahembe
 Kagulwe
 Kaloleni
 Kaseke
 Kwisamilo
 Mahembe
 Ndelembela A
 Ndelemela B
 Chankabwimba
 Chankabwimba
 Kabanga
 Kichangachui
 Mshingisha

References

Wards of Kigoma Region